Mogadischu is a 2008 German made-for-TV thriller film chronicling the events surrounding the hijacking of Lufthansa Flight 181 by the Popular Front for the Liberation of Palestine in 1977. Directed by Roland Suso Richter, it was first shown on public broadcasting channel Das Erste on 30 November 2008.

Synopsis
On 13 October 1977, Lufthansa Flight 181, a Boeing 737-230 Adv named Landshut, is on its way from the vacation island of Mallorca to Frankfurt when it is hijacked by a team of four terrorists representing the Popular Front for the Liberation of Palestine. They demand the release of several leaders of the Red Army Faction (RAF) who are imprisoned in Germany. German Chancellor Helmut Schmidt refuses to negotiate with terrorists, aware that he is endangering not only the lives aboard the Landshut, but also that of German business leader Hanns Martin Schleyer, who is being held hostage by the RAF.

The plane makes its way through several stops to Aden in South Yemen, where the captain, Jürgen Schumann, is murdered by the hijackers. The plane continues on its way, eventually landing in Mogadishu, Somalia. As flight attendant Gabriele Dillmann and the surviving crew try their best to keep their passengers safe and calm, Colonel Ulrich Wegener leads the German federal police's newly formed counter-terrorism unit, GSG 9, in preparations to storm the Landshut.

In the night between 17 and 18 October, Schmidt gives Wegener the order to storm the plane and free the hostages. Somali ranger units create a fire as a distraction, allowing members of GSG 9 to approach the Landshut from behind and from the sides. Operation "Feuerzauber" is successful, with all hostages rescued. Three hijackers are gunned down and killed, the fourth is seriously injured. One GSG 9 member and a flight attendant are injured. Schmidt is informed by phone that "the job is done."

Cast 
 Thomas Kretschmann as Jürgen Schumann, captain of Lufthansa Flight 181
 Nadja Uhl as Gabriele Dillmann, a flight attendant aboard Flight 181
 Saïd Taghmaoui as Zohair Youssif Akache, the leader of the hijackers
 Herbert Knaup as Colonel Ulrich Wegener, head of the GSG 9 team
 Jürgen Tarrach as Hans-Jürgen Wischnewski, state minister in the German Chancellery
 Christian Berkel as Helmut Schmidt, Chancellor of Germany
 Simon Verhoeven as Jürgen Vietor, co-pilot
 Tobias Licht as Baum
 Cornelia Schmaus as Lyvia Vamos
 Valerie Niehaus as Birgitt Röhll
 Youssef Hamid as Wadie Haddad, head of the Popular Front for the Liberation of Palestine
 Gernot Kunert as Hanns Martin Schleyer, German business leader and hostage of the Red Army Faction
 Franz Dinda as Peter-Jürgen Boock, a member of the RAF
 Bettina Hoppe as Brigitte Mohnhaupt, a member of the RAF
 Sofi Mohamed as Siad Barre, president of Somalia

Production 
Filming took place between October and December 2007, at locations in Munich, Berlin, Ulm, Bonn, and Casablanca. The working title was Mogadischu Welcome.

External links
 
 

2008 films
2008 thriller films
German thriller films
2000s German-language films
Thriller films based on actual events
Films set in the 1970s
Films about terrorism in Europe
Cultural depictions of the Red Army Faction
2008 television films
German television films
German-language television shows
Films scored by Martin Todsharow
Films shot in Morocco
Films about aircraft hijackings
Films set in Mogadishu
Films set in West Germany
2000s German films
Das Erste original programming